Indianapolis Regional Airport  is a public use airport in Hancock County, Indiana, United States. Owned by Indianapolis Airport Authority, it is 12 nautical miles (22 km) east of the central business district of Indianapolis. It was known as Mount Comfort Airport until March 2011.

This facility is included in the National Plan of Integrated Airport Systems for 2017–2021, which categorized it as a general aviation reliever airport for Indianapolis International Airport. Although many U.S. airports use the same three-letter location identifier for the FAA and IATA, Indianapolis Regional Airport is assigned MQJ by the FAA but has no designation from the IATA (which assigned MQJ to Moma Airport in Khonuu, Russia).

Facilities and aircraft 
Indianapolis Regional Airport covers an area of 1,805 acres (730 ha) at an elevation of 862 feet (263 m) above mean sea level. It has two runways: 7/25 with a  asphalt surface and 16/34 with a  concrete surface.

For the 12-month period ending December 31, 2011, the airport had 47,600 aircraft operations, an average of 130 per day: 84% general aviation and 16% air taxi. In June 2018, there were 107 aircraft based at this airport: 87 single-engine, 8 multi-engine, 10 jet, 1 helicopter and 1 glider.

References

External links 

 Indianapolis Regional Airport, official page from Indianapolis Airport Authority
 Indy Jet, the fixed-base operator (FBO)
 
 Aerial image as of March 1998 from USGS The National Map
 

Airports in Indiana
Transportation in Indianapolis
Transportation buildings and structures in Hancock County, Indiana